El País de las mujeres (English title: The Country of Women) is a Venezuelan telenovela written by Leonardo Padrón and produced by Venevisión. This telenovela lasted 188 episodes and was distributed internationally by Venevisión International.

Ana Karina Manco and Víctor Cámara starred as the main protagonists with the stellar participation of Caridad Canelón, Carolina Perpetuo, Lourdes Valera, Nohely Arteaga and Viviana Gibelli. Aroldo Betancourt, Miguel Ángel Landa and Amanda Gutierrez starred as antagonists.

Synopsis
On the day that Arcadia Gómez summons her five nieces to inform them that she will soon be dead, she receives a surprise of devastating proportions: all of them, without exception, have come down with a virus called "impossible love". Mariana, Miranda, Pamela, Julia and Chiqui - modern, enterprising, independent, young women - have all their hearts shattered to pieces by men.

Realizing the degree of destruction caused by the opposite sex, Arcadia decides to take drastic measures. Along with her nieces, she enters the battlefront declaring open war on all the shameless, cunning and unfaithful men who have made them suffer. Now, living under one roof and with one purpose in mind, these six beautiful women, will become a unique army that will use the mightiest weapon nature has given them: the power of their feminine charms. It is an army of women ready for anything... and the war has just begun.

Cast

Main Cast
Ana Karina Manco as Mariana Campos Gómez
Víctor Cámara as Camilo Reyes
Jean Carlo Simancas as Fabian Aristimuño
Viviana Gibelli as Pamela Fuentes Gómez
Carolina Perpetuo as Miranda Fuentes Gómez
Orlando Urdaneta as Jacobo Reyes
Nohely Arteaga as Julia Gallardo Gómez
Aroldo Betancourt as Rodolfo Matamoros
Lourdes Valera as Chiqui Gallardo Gómez
Caridad Canelón as Arcadia Gómez de Peña
Miguel Angel Landa as Arsenio Peña
Elba Escobar as Catalina de Falcón
Gustavo Rodríguez as Lucas Falcón

Supporting cast

Pedro Lander as Manrique
Gabriela Vergara as Almendra Sánchez
Roberto Lamarca as Tino Urutia
Elisa Escámez as Cienfuegos
Yanis Chimaras as Raymond Ruiz
Luis Gerónimo Abreu as Salvador Falcón
Ana Castell as Sagrario de Sánchez
Pedro Durán as Prospero Sánchez
Vicente Tepedino as Diego
Tania Sarabia as Josefina Beltrán de Negretti
Raúl Amundaray as Cuenca
Maria Fabiola Colmenares as Sandra
Tatiana Capote as herself
Mauricio González as Felicio Campos
Amanda Gutiérrez as Natalia
Rafael Romero as Javier
Alberto Alifa as Daniel
Gigi Zancheta as Greta
Natalia Capelletti as Cristina
José Luis Zuleta as Jefferson
Sonia Villamizar as Graciela
Carolina Muziotti as Carola
Andreína Yépez as Yulessi
César Román as Mojallito
Carlos Flores as Crespito
Samantha Suárez as Alejandrita Reyes Gallardo
Osiris Manrique as Ulises Falcón Marino
Judith Vázquez as Mariela
Carlos Carrera as Crespo
Ana Mássimo as Yuberí
Luis Alberto de Mozos as Doctor
Isabel Moreno as Abogada
Francisco Ferrari as Abogado
Martha Carbillo as Justina
Joel Sandoval as Tonito
Mimi Lazo as herself
Gioconda Belli

References

External links

 

1998 telenovelas
Venevisión telenovelas
Venezuelan telenovelas
1998 Venezuelan television series debuts
1998 Venezuelan television series endings
Spanish-language telenovelas
Television shows set in Venezuela